Melicope cruciata, also called pilo 'ula or cross-bearing pelea, is a species of plant in the family Rutaceae. It is endemic to the Hawaiian Islands.

References

cruciata
Endemic flora of Hawaii
Taxonomy articles created by Polbot
Critically endangered flora of the United States